Benjamin James Foden (born 22 July 1985) is an English rugby union player who plays for Rugby United New York (RUNY) in Major League Rugby (MLR). A fullback or scrum-half, he won 34 caps for England between 2009 and 2013. He also plays as a Wing.

Career
Born in Chester, Foden was educated at Bishop Heber High School in Malpas, Cheshire before moving to the sixth form at Bromsgrove School. His Bromsgrove School teacher Paul Mullan was a big influence on his career, as was his father, Rob, who coached Ben and brother Tom's youth team.

Foden's career has been divided between playing at scrum-half and fullback, though he can also operate on the wing. In an interview in March 2009, Foden accepted that his future lay at playing fullback.

Foden played for Cheshire and North of England U16s, and England U16s. He then went on to play for England U19s, and England Counties.

Club
He joined Sale Sharks in 2004. Foden's desire to play scrum half saw him sign for Northampton Saints on the basis of a promise to play him at his preferred position; a promise that Sale Sharks could not give him, considering his strong performances at full-back, and the club presence of England international scrum-half Richard Wigglesworth and the arrival of Welsh international Dwayne Peel for the next season. In the 2005–2006 season, Foden played as a replacement in the final as Sale won their first ever Premiership title.

He gained his nickname of "Pop Idol" or "Pops" by missing the first day of pre-season with the Sharks for an audition on the programme.

He began his Northampton Saints career competing with Lee Dickson for the scrum half position; Dickson won the battle for the scrum half shirt, and Northampton frequently used Foden at full back. In the 2008–09 season, he helped the Saints win the European Challenge Cup.

In March 2011, following a Saints win over Wasps, Foden was arrested following an altercation with a taxi driver in London, but both Northampton and the RFU were happy to let the issue lie after he accepted a police caution.

In May 2014, Foden won the Aviva Premiership title with Northampton, playing 80 minutes plus extra time in the final against Saracens at full back and scoring a try.

Foden played on the wing for most of the 2016-17 season, scoring five tries. The most recent of those tries came as Saints secured their place in the European Rugby Champions Cup for the following campaign as they fought off Stade Francais in the European Champions Cup play-off final.

After a decade with the club Northampton confirmed that Foden would be leaving at the end of the 2017/18 season. In July 2018, Rugby United New York announced that they had signed Foden for the 2019 Major League Rugby Season.

International
Foden was included in the England U21s team for the 2005 Six Nations and World Championships, and the 2006 Six Nations and World Championship. Foden was a member of the 2006 Grand Slam winning England U21 squad, playing in all five matches and notching up three tries. He went on to play at the 2006 Under 21 Rugby World Championship later that year, sharing the number 9 jersey with Danny Care. He played for the England Sevens in 2006/7 and 2007/8, and the England Saxons at the 2008 Churchill Cup against USA before being included in the England Elite Playing Squad.

Foden was named in the England squad for the Six Nations on 14 January 2009, and earned his first cap for the England v  match on 7 February 2009 when he came on as a replacement at scrum-half for Harry Ellis, with England winning 36–11.

Foden was included in the England squad for the 2009 summer tour against the Barbarians and Argentina and made his first start for England in the uncapped game against the Barbarians on 30 May 2009, a game which saw him playing on the wing and scoring a try in the 32nd minute.

Despite fullback Delon Armitage being injured for the 2009 Investec Autumn Internationals, Foden was not included in the squad – manager Martin Johnson instead preferring to play wings Ugo Monye and Mark Cueto out of position. An improved performance by the England side saw Foden score his first try in a Test match, though the team lost 12–10.

Although England lost the first Test, they won the second 20–21. He also featured as a replacement in an uncapped game for England against the  side.

Foden was named in the elite player squad for the 2010–11 season.
Later that year he cemented his place as England's first-choice fullback, his early flirtation with scrum-half shelved after some strong form. Foden was a key member of the side that beat Australia twice in 2010 and also started all of England's Six Nations games as they came up short of a Grand Slam in 2011. He gained more metres (100.6) in the 2011 6 Nations than any other player in the Championship. Foden was selected for England's 2011 World Cup squad, holding off the challenge of Delon Armitage to retain the fullback shirt during England's disappointing campaign.

Television

In October 2019, Foden was a contestant in The X Factor: Celebrity as a member of the group, Try Star, alongside Levi Davis and Thom Evans. They were eliminated in the semi-final, finishing in fifth place.

In October 2021, it was announced that Foden would be participating in the fourteenth series of Dancing on Ice.

International tries

† Full international cap not awarded for Barbarians Test match

Personal life
Foden married Una Healy of girl group The Saturdays on 30 June 2012 in her native Ireland. They have two children, daughter Aoife (b.2012) and son Tadhg (b.2015). In July 2018, it was announced that Foden and Healy had separated. Foden married Jackie Belanoff-Smith in 2019. On 20 May 2020, Jackie gave birth to their daughter Farrah.

References

External links
England profile
Northampton Saints Profile

Premiership Profile
Whitchurch Rugby Club
Career Stats@Statbunker 
RUNY Signing

1985 births
Living people
England international rugby union players
English rugby union players
English expatriate rugby union players
English expatriate sportspeople in the United States
Expatriate rugby union players in the United States
Northampton Saints players
People educated at Bromsgrove School
Rugby New York players
Sale Sharks players
Rugby union players from Chester
Rugby union fullbacks